Klin may refer to:

Places
Klin, Podlaskie Voivodeship, in northeastern Poland
Klin, Lublin Voivodeship, in eastern Poland
Klin Urban Settlement, a municipal formation which the Town of Klin in Klinsky District of Moscow Oblast, Russia is incorporated as
Klin, Russia, several inhabited localities in Russia
Klin, Námestovo District, Slovakia
Klin (mountain), Slovakia

People
Ami Klin, American autism expert

Other
Klin (air base), an air base in Moscow Oblast, Russia
Klin sub-machine gun, a Russian sub-machine gun
KLIN, a radio station in Lincoln, Nebraska, United States

See also
Klina or Klinë, a city and municipality in the District of Peć in north-western Kosovo
Kline (disambiguation)
Klinsky (disambiguation)